Iran participated in the 2014 Asian Games in Incheon, South Korea.

Competitors

Medal summary

Medal table

Medalists

Results by event

Aquatics

Swimming

Men

Archery

Men's compound

Women's compound

Athletics

Men

Women

Badminton

Men

Women

Basketball 

Men

Boxing

Men

Canoeing

Slalom

Men

Women

Sprint
Men

Women

Cycling

Mountain bike
Men

Road
Men

Track

Men

Fencing

Men

Football

Men

Gymnastics

Artistic

Men

Handball
Men

Judo

Men

Kabaddi

Men

Women

Karate

Men's kumite

Women's kumite

Rowing

Men

Women

Sailing

Men

Shooting

Men

Women

Table tennis

Men

Women

Taekwondo

Men

Women

Volleyball

Indoor

Men

Weightlifting

Men

Wrestling

Men's freestyle

Men's Greco-Roman

Wushu

Men's taolu

Men's sanda

Women's taolu

Women's sanda

References

External links
Official website

Nations at the 2014 Asian Games
2014
Asian Games